Wilderness Trail Bikes (usually shortened to WTB) is a privately owned company based in Marin County, California, USA. Founded in 1982 as a company that specialized in mountain bike parts, today WTB sources and sells its product worldwide supplying bike manufacturers and bike shops with components including tires, saddles, rims and grips.

History 
Marin County is the birthplace of the mountain bike, which had its origins in the late 1970s and early 1980s. Steve Potts, who was already building bike frames in Mill Valley in 1980, teamed up with Mark Slate to help meet demand. Charlie Cunningham, in Fairfax, had been building mountain bikes since 1979 with heat-treated aluminum frames which had unique Type II forks, roller-cam brakes, custom-made hubs and other components that were among the first of their kind designed specifically for mountain bikes. 

Steve Potts, Charlie Cunningham and Mark Slate worked together informally from 1980 on limited production components, almost exclusively for the bicycles that they produced individually. In 1982, they founded Wilderness Trail Bikes, or WTB. Increasing demand and per-unit price advantages had led the three to form WTB to produce components for the new and fast-growing sport of mountain biking in the mountains of Marin and to market the components that they were producing.

In 1988, Patrick Seidler, began working with WTB.  This new company focused on licensing technology developed by WTB to mainstream bicycle industry manufacturers. Examples of technology developed by WTB that were produced under license include designs for tires made by Specialized Bicycle Components, the Blackburn B-52 water bottle cage, geometry for the 1987 Trek Bicycle Corporation mountain bike line and the use of Greaseguard in the top-end Suntour XC Pro component group.  

In 2002, Cunningham and Potts ceased to be part of WTB, leaving Mark Slate as the sole original member.   During this time WTB began OEMing parts to major manufacturers like Gary Fisher Bikes, Marin Bikes, etc. 

Over time, WTB has evolved to become a seller of tires, saddles, rims, wheels, grips and other parts mass-produced overseas. Today, WTB components can be found on bikes all around the world and are used for transportation, recreation, adventure and racing.

WTB continues to support racers, providing sponsorship for riders.

Corporate advocacy 
Wilderness Trail Bikes had created a 501 (c)(3) non-profit organization called Transportation Alternatives for Marin (TAM). TAM’s mission was to develop safe bike routes for commuting and for schools throughout Marin. TAM 501(c)(3) nonprofit status was revoked by the Internal Revenue Service in October 2018.

References

External links
 Wilderness Trail Bikes

Cycle manufacturers of the United States
Manufacturing companies established in 1982
Mountain bike manufacturers
Companies based in California
1982 establishments in California